Travancore State Manual was a publication of the erstwhile Travancore kingdom, written and published under the statutory command of the king of Travancore. The Travancore kingdom was located at the southernmost tip of the Indian subcontinent, on its western side. 
Travancore State Manual was written by V. Nagam Aiya, who was then working as the Dewan Peishcar in Travancore government service. 

The section on the Fauna of Travancore was contributed by Harold S. Ferguson, Esq. (F. L. N., F. Z. S), who Nagam Aiya describes in the following words: "a subject upon which he is an authority having spent nearly the whole of his life in the country, first as a Planter for several years on the Travancore Hills, then as the Guardian of the Princes, then as Commandant of one of the battalions in the Travancore army (Nayar Brigade), and lastly as the Director of the Government Museum and the Public Gardens at Trivandrum."

The writing 

V Nagam Aiya mentions that he was commanded by His Highness, the Maharajah of Travancore to write the Travancore State Manual with the simple instruction that it should follow the model of the district manuals of the Madras Presidency, which was under English rule.  However, he also mentions that the idea had been ‘broached’ to him by Dewan T. Rama Row, C.I.E., some fourteen years earlier.  At that time, Nagam Aiya had been working as the Dewan Peishcar and District Magistrate of Quilon.  Even though, the Dewan did obtain the Maharajah sanction for the project, the Dewan himself retired within a few months, and the matter was dropped. 

However, the matter was revived by Dewan Mr. K. Krishnaswamy Row, C.I.E., in 1901.  Nagam Aiya did a lot of pioneering and original research and work to obtain a lot of information for the preparation of this book. What came out was a book of ‘encyclopaedic nature spread over a space of more than 1820 pages of letter-press’. 

It might be correct to think that Nagam Aiya did have this project in his mind, and he must have collected or at least noted down a lot of information much before he started on this work.  He started his work on this project as a full-time officer from December 1904.

Contents 

The Travancore State Manual is a huge book not only on the antiquity of Travancore, but also of various other features of the place.  It is not a just a book on the history of the place. A detailed study and examination of the physical features, geology, Climate, Rainfall, Meteorology, Flora, Fauna, and Archaeology of the place is also there. 

Detailed writings are there on the geographical location, boundaries, shape and area of the landscape, mountains, plateaus, mountain passes,  rivers, canal and backwaters, coastline, ports, shipping facilities, economic geology of the place, climate, rainfall, meteorology, trees,  and medicinal plants, flowering and ornamental plants, birds and animals etc., archaeology, architecture, sculpture, coins, inscriptions, forts and military works, ‘Archaeology’, ‘Fauna’, census and population, language, economic condition  and various other things are dealt with, in a manner that should astound.
There are a number of photographs. Apart from that, there are many pictures of the stone inscriptions collected from various parts of the kingdom. 
The latter part of the book deals in detail on the history of the localities that were later to be joined together to form Travancore kingdom.  The delineation of history starts from the Parasurama legend.  This legend is also mentioned in great detail.  Then it slowly moves to the times of the Perumals. 

Mentions about the Malabar and Travancore coasts in the ancient maritime trade records are seen sourced out. 

Then the history part deals with the ancient kings. There is a mention of a Kurava King, who seems to have been assassinated in a premeditated conspiracy. 

There is either detailed mention or detailed write-up on such items as early missionaries, neighbouring kingdoms, accounts of Travellers, Portuguese in Malabar and Travancore, Ettuvittial Pillamaar, Marthanda Varma, Zamorin, small kings  and kingdoms north of Travancore, small-time rulers of Malabar, the attacks and occupation attempts by Sultan Tipu etc. 

Velu Thampi Dalawa’s rebellion is dealt with in details. Even though there is sympathy for the person, in a profound analysis, Nagam Aiya does not find his cause correct or praiseworthy.  The proclamation made by Velu Thampi from Kundara is quoted in an elaborate manner. However, a full reading of the same would not find it to be in sync with modern Indian aspirations.  

QUOTE: Velu Tampi was a daring and clever though unscrupulous man. Rebellion was his forte. END of QUOTE. 

QUOTE: His favourite modes of punishment were: imprisonment, confiscation of property, public flogging, cutting off the palm of the hand, the ears or the nose, impalement or crucifying people by driving down nails on their chests to trees, and such like, too abhorrent to record here. END of QUOTE.

All rulers of Travancore, since the reign of King Marthanda Varma are dealt in reasonable detail. Swathi Thirunal’s (King Rama Varma) tragic life has been mentioned.

Problems with the contents 

From the perspective of modern Indian history and sociology writings, this book has many issues which can make it a disturbance.  The main problem is that it is written in a sort of impartial and non-jingoistic manner.  

The writing of this book has been done from a most impartial manner with regard to caste and social issues. Even though Nagam Aiya is a Brahmin, there has been no attempt to portray any group or castes as above blame. In fact, the detailing is so honest, that not many modern Travancorians would actually like to recommend this book to anyone for a detailed reading. 

The various false aspirations and claims of the various castes and the tragic sides of their lives have been portrayed with rare honesty. 

The general culture of official corruption rampant in Travancore bureaucracy, which was more or less hereditary caste-based in mentioned in raw words. 
The lower castes are also not mentioned in a praiseworthy manner. 

The next item of jingoistic reproach would be the very obvious support to the English colonial rule. This feature can be felt in many pages dealing with the colonial times in the subcontinent.  In the very introduction of the book, Nagam Aiya mentions thus: 

QUOTE: ultimate success of the English East India Company, our early friendships with them and the staunch support which they in return uniformly gave us through all vicissitudes of fortune, ultimately resulting in a strong bond of political alliance and reciprocal trust and confidence, which assured to us internal security and immunity from external aggression, thus enabling us to achieve the triumphs of peace and good government, until step by step we reached the enviable height of being known as the Model Native State’ of India END OF QUOTE

King Marthanda Varma’s words on his deathbed: QUOTE: That, above all, the friendship existing between the English East India Company and Travancore should be maintained at any risk, and that full confidence should always be placed in the support and aid of that honourable association." END OF QUOTE is also mentioned in the book. 

These kind of writings found in various parts of the book as well as other items of a similar kind does lend support to the feeling that Nagam Aiya was supportive of the English rulers in the neighbouring Madras Presidency. 

Another item that can disturb modern folks in south Kerala would be the details given about the social revolts by the lower castes, such as the Ezhava, Shanars, Pulaya, Pariah etc. for social and political freedom. Enough and more historical incidences are mentioned that point to the fact that this social upheaval was the handiwork of the English Missionaries from the London Missionary Society.  Beyond that it is seen mentioned that each time such social problems happened, the English officials from Madras exerted pressure on the raja family to give the freedom that was demanded by the lower castes. 

However, Nagam Aiya does hint that the English rulers did not understand the social issues correctly. That even when the lower castes were given some freedom that had not been traditionally given to them, they used the occasion to go beyond what was allowed, and create social problems and rioting.
The history of such incidences  could more or less deprive the claims of some lower castes leaders that they were the persons who had spearheaded the social revolution in Travancore. 

Another item that can be actively disliked is the statement that Malayalam, the erstwhile language of Travancore kingdom, and currently the state language of Kerala, is of very recent origin. 

QUOTE: Another fact disclosed by the statements already given is that the language of most of the inscriptions is Tamil. The reason here is equally simple. Malayalam as a national language is not very old. Its resemblance to old Tamil is so patent that one could hardly help concluding that Malayalam is nothing more than old Tamil with a good admixture of Sanskrit words. END of QUOTE.

In fact, there is a strong hint that the actual antiquity of Travancore is Tamil. Almost all the stone inscriptions mentioned in the book are in Tamil, with a few in Sanskrit. 

Sultan Tippu (Tipu Sulthaan), who is revered by some as a great freedom fighter, is not mentioned in the superlative.

Reference
 LINK

Availability of the book 

The print version of Travancore State Manual is available. However, the original book can be downloaded as a digitalised scanned version from archive dot org. LINK
Another very readable digital book is also available on archive dot org, with a very curious commentary inside it. LINK

Other books on the same or connected subject 

To get a complete picture of the subject matter, this book should be read along with such other books as
1. Native life in Travancore by Rev. Samuel Mateer
2. Castes and Tribes of Southern India by Edgar Thurston
3. Malabar Manual by William Logan

See also
 Cochin State Manual
Travancore State Manual pdf Digital book
A commentary on V. Nagam Aiya’s TRAVANCORE STATE MANUAL

References

Colonial Kerala
Gazetteers of India
Kingdom of Travancore
Indian books
1906 non-fiction books
Books about the princely states of India